Menegazzia fertilis is a species of foliose lichen found in Australia. It was described as new to science in 1992.

See also
List of Menegazzia species

References

fertilis
Lichen species
Lichens described in 1992
Lichens of Australia
Taxa named by Peter Wilfred James